Adat Shiva Temple  is located at Adat village in Thrissur district. The temple has two main deities, Sri Parameswara and Maha Vishnu. Both deities having separate temple complex. Lord Sri Parameswara facing east and Maha Vishnu is facing west. It is believed that Shiva temple is one of the 108 Shiva temples of Kerala and is installed by sage Parasurama dedicated to Shiva.

Adat Vishnu Temple

There is a fascinating myth about the name of Adat and Adat Maha Vishnu Temple. This is associated with Kurur Mana House and mother (Kururamma). There was a boy who came to help Kururamma with her daily Guruvayoorappan puja. Waiting for the priest Vilwamangalam Swamiyaronce Kururamma saw that the boy who had come to help had eaten the offeringNaivedhya and she closed the boy in a pot. Later they came to the conclusion that this boy is really Guruvayurappan and from then onwards the place became known as Adat in the sense that the pot was "closed".

See also
 108 Shiva Temples
 Temples of Kerala

References

108 Shiva Temples
Shiva temples in Kerala
Hindu temples in Thrissur district